Kevin Lee (born 3 March 1961) is a British swimmer. Lee competed in two events at the 1980 Summer Olympics. He represented England in the 100 metres butterfly, at the 1982 Commonwealth Games in Brisbane, Queensland, Australia. He won the 1983 ASA National Championship title in the 100 metres butterfly.

References

External links
 

1961 births
Living people
British male swimmers
Olympic swimmers of Great Britain
Swimmers at the 1980 Summer Olympics
Place of birth missing (living people)
Swimmers at the 1982 Commonwealth Games
Commonwealth Games competitors for England
Male butterfly swimmers